Tejutla may refer to:
Tejutla, Chalatenango, El Salvador
Tejutla, San Marcos, Guatemala